The 2003 Men's African Volleyball Championship was held in Cairo, Egypt, from August 01 to August 06, 2003.

Teams

Group stage

Group A

|}

|}

Group B

|}

|}

Knockout stage

Seventh place match

|}

Fifth place match

|}

Championship bracket

Semifinals

|}

Bronze medal match

|}

Final

|}

Final standing

Awards
Best Scorer:  Noureddine Hfaiedh
Best Digger:  Wael Alaydy
Best Spiker:  Hamdy El-Safy
Best Blocker:  Ndaki Mboulet
Best Server:  Nanga Guy
Best Setter:  Ghazi Guidara
Best Reception:  Dif Hassan

References

 Men Volleyball Africa Championship 2003 Cairo (EGY)
 FIVB Press Release 06/08/2003

2003 Men
Men's African Volleyball Championship
African Men's Volleyball Championship
Men's African Volleyball Championship
International volleyball competitions hosted by Kenya